Protection Spells is a tour-only album by Songs: Ohia. It is a collection of 9 improvised pieces recorded by Jason Molina whilst on tour in 1999. It was limited to 500 copies and released by Secretly Canadian in 2000.

Track listing
All songs written by Jason Molina.
"Trouble Will Find You"
"The Moon Undoes It All"
"Darkness That Strong"
"Keep Only One of Us Free"
"The World at the End of the World"
"Fire on the Shore"
"Mighty Like Love, Mighty Like Sorrow"
"The One Red Star"
"Whenever I Have Done a Thing in Flames"

Credits
Jason Molina
Joseph Brumley
Daniel Burton
Jonathan Cargill
Chris Carothers
Geof Comings
Dave Fischoff
Rory Leitch
Microtec
June Panic
Alasdair Roberts
Jochem Schouten
Ben Swanson
Chris Swanson
Richard Youngs

References

External links
 Secretly Canadian press release

2000 albums
Jason Molina albums
Secretly Canadian albums